Biddlecomb is a surname. Notable people with the surname include:

Captain Isaac Biddlecomb
Virginia Stanton Biddlecomb

See also
Biddlecombe